Symington is a surname of Scottish origin. Notable people with the surname include:

Symington family (United States)
Fife Symington III (born 1945), American politician; Governor of Arizona
Gaye Symington (born 1954), American politician, Speaker of the Vermont House of Representatives
Herbert James Symington (1881–1965), Canadian lawyer and aviation businessman
J. Fife Symington Jr. (1910–2007), American diplomat
James Ayton Symington  (1859–1939), British illustrator
James H. Symington (1913–1987), American Christian evangelical leader
James W. Symington (born 1927), American politician; U.S. representative from Missouri
Marc Symington (born 1980), English cricketer
Neville Symington (1937–2019), British psychoanalyst
Sara Symington (born 1969), English cyclist and Olympian
Stuart Symington (1901–1988), American businessman and politician; U.S. Senator from Missouri
Stuart Symington (cricketer) (1926–2009), English cricketer and captain of Leicestershire
William Symington (1764–1831), Scottish engineer and inventor, and steamboat builder
W. Stuart Symington (diplomat) (contemporary), American diplomat and ambassador

References

Surnames of Scottish origin